Charles Edward Alexander Hedger (born 18 September 1980) is a British guitarist who is known for his stint in the extreme metal band Cradle of Filth and his work with Imperial Vengeance. He currently plays with Norwegian black metal band Mayhem under the alias Ghul. In the past he also performed live on stage with bands like Tormentor and Shining, and continues to do so occasionally.

Early life
Hedger showed musical interest from an early age. When he was 13, his brother gave him a copy of a tape from a local band that some of his friends were in, the demo tape was called The Principle of Evil Made Flesh, from an at the time fledgling British heavy metal band, Cradle of Filth. After learning much about guitar playing, at 19, Hedger decided to take his guitar playing seriously, and he moved to London where he was accepted into the Guitar Institute in London to study a degree course in Popular Music Performance BMus on guitar.  He graduated in 2004.

The following year his brother died, and Hedger became greatly influenced to continue his guitar career in honour of his brother. He then started his own band, End of Invention, in which he played lead guitar and vocals. He also began teaching guitar lessons at Colchester Institute, and studied orchestration and composition.

Cradle of Filth
In 2005, Hedger was asked to fill in on bass guitar for Dave Pybus, who made a short leave from the 2005 Cradle of Filth tour. Upon the return of Pybus, Hedger played guitar along with Paul Allender.

As well as Cradle of Filth, Hedger has his own band, Imperial Vengeance, plays guitar with Mayhem, as well as composing for TV and film, and has written music tuition articles for Terrorizer magazine.

References

External links
 Facebook 
 Website 

English heavy metal guitarists
English male guitarists
1980 births
Living people
British rock guitarists
British male guitarists
Cradle of Filth members
Place of birth missing (living people)
Black metal guitarists
Mayhem (band) members